Low Roar was an Icelandic post-rock/electronica project founded by the late American immigrant Ryan Karazija. Originally a solo act, the band later added Leifur Björnsson and Logi Guðmundsson.

History
After leading the California-based indie rock band Audrye Sessions from 2002 to 2010, Karazija relocated to Reykjavík, Iceland and started the new project Low Roar, releasing a self-titled album in 2011. A second album, 0, was released in 2014 by Tonequake Records, followed by Once in a Long, Long While... in mid-2017. The Low Roar album, ross., was released in November 2019, with their latest album maybe tomorrow... released in July 2021.

The band's discography features heavily in the 2019 video game Death Stranding, following a collaboration with video game designer Hideo Kojima, after Kojima chanced upon their music while in a CD shop in Reykjavík. Kojima described Low Roar's music as "sensual" and "unique". When Sony first contacted the band to license their music for Death Stranding, the band was struggling, with much of their music being recorded on a laptop in Karazija's kitchen. The use of Low Roar's music in the video game had a significant positive influence on the band's popularity.

In 2021 they recorded the song "Feels" for the mobile game Arknights, later released in full under the title "Fade Away" on their 2021 album "maybe tomorrow...".

Their song "Help Me" plays over the end credits of the 2021 film Flee.

On 29 October 2022, it was announced that Ryan Karazija, founder and lead singer of the band, had died at the age of 40. Hours later, it was revealed that the cause of death was from complications with pneumonia. It was also announced that a sixth album, which was being edited as of 2022, will be eventually released.

Discography

Albums
 Low Roar (2011)
 0 (2014)
 Once in a Long, Long While... (2017)
 ross. (2019)
 maybe tomorrow... (2021)

EPs
 Hávallagata 30 (2014)
 Remix - EP (2015)
 Inure (2020)

Live albums
 Live at Gamla Bíó (2015)

Singles
 The Sky Is Falling (2018)
 Everything To Lose (2021)
 Hummingbird (2021)

References

External links
 
 

Icelandic post-rock groups
Musical groups established in 2011
2011 establishments in Iceland